Sara Gama (born 27 March 1989) is an Italian professional footballer who plays as a centre back and captains both Serie A club Juventus FC and the Italy women's national team.

Club career 
Gama has also played for PSG of Division 1 Féminine, UPC Tavagnacco and Calcio Chiasiellis of Serie A, as well as American W-League team Pali Blues.

International career
She is a member of the Italian national team, and took part in the 2009 European Championship. As an Under-19 international she won the 2008 U-19 European Championship serving as the team's captain, and was named the tournament's MVP.

Gama made her senior debut for the Italy women's national football team in June 2006, in a 2–1 defeat by Ukraine in qualifying for the 2007 FIFA Women's World Cup.

National coach Antonio Cabrini named Gama in his selection for UEFA Women's Euro 2013 in Sweden.

International goals

Personal life 
Gama's mother is Italian, while her father is Congolese.

In 2017, she graduated in Languages at the Università degli Studi di Udine. She speaks Italian, English, French and Spanish.

In 2018, for the International Women's Day, Mattel presented the Sara Gama Barbie doll as part of the Barbie Sheroes doll line.

Honours
Brescia
 Serie A: 2015–16
 Coppa Italia: 2015–16
 Italian Women's Super Cup: 2015, 2016

Juventus
 Serie A: 2017–18, 2018–19, 2019–20, 2020–21, 2021–22
 Coppa Italia: 2018–19, 
 Supercoppa Italiana: 2019, 2020–21, 2021–22

Individual
 AIC Best Women's XI: 2019
 Italian Football Hall of Fame: 2019

See also
 List of women's footballers with 100 or more caps

References

External links

 

1989 births
Living people
Italian women's footballers
Italy women's international footballers
Footballers from Trieste
Pali Blues players
Paris Saint-Germain Féminine players
USL W-League (1995–2015) players
Expatriate women's footballers in France
Italian expatriate sportspeople in France
Italian expatriate women's footballers
Expatriate women's soccer players in the United States
Women's association football defenders
A.C.F. Brescia Calcio Femminile players
U.P.C. Tavagnacco players
Italian people of Democratic Republic of the Congo descent
Italian sportspeople of African descent
Serie A (women's football) players
Juventus F.C. (women) players
Division 1 Féminine players
A.S.D. Calcio Chiasiellis players
2019 FIFA Women's World Cup players
FIFA Century Club
UEFA Women's Euro 2022 players
UEFA Women's Euro 2017 players
Italian expatriate sportspeople in the United States